The 29th Metro Manila Film Festival was held in the Philippine International Convention Center, Pasay, Philippines, from December 25, 2003 to January 8, 2004.

Maricel Soriano and Eric Quizon were chosen the Best Actress and Best Actor respectively in the 2003 Metro Manila Film Festival for playing the eldest child roles in two different films. Soriano plays the oldest of six children in Viva Films' Filipinas, while Quizon plays the eldest son who, in keeping with Chinese tradition, hires professional mourners to weep at his father's funeral, in Unitel Pictures' Crying Ladies. Hilda Koronel, cast as a 1970s bit player whose career is on the wane in Crying Ladies, was named the Best Supporting Actress, while Victor Neri won as the Best Supporting Actor for playing the activist-middle son in Filipinas.

Entries
There are two batches of films in competition, the first batch was shown from December 25, while the second batch was shown on January 1, 2004.

Winners and nominees

Awards
Winners are listed first and highlighted in boldface.

People's Choice awards
Winners are listed first and highlighted in boldface.

Multiple awards

Box Office gross
Only final rankings as of January 8, 2004 were released.

References

External links

Metro Manila Film Festival
MMFF
MMFF
MMFF
MMFF